The Levantine corridor is the relatively narrow strip between the Mediterranean Sea to the northwest and deserts to the southeast which connects Africa to Eurasia. This corridor is a land route of migrations of animals between Eurasia and Africa. In particular, it is believed that early hominins spread from Africa to Eurasia via the Levantine corridor and Horn of Africa. The corridor is named after the Levant.

Location and geography
The Levantine Corridor is the western part of the Fertile Crescent, the eastern part being Mesopotamia.

Dispersal route for plants
Botanists recognize this area as a dispersal route of plant species.

Dispersal route for humans
The distribution of Y-chromosome and mtDNA haplogroups suggests that during the Paleolithic and Mesolithic periods, the Levantine corridor was more important for bi-directional human migrations between Africa and Eurasia than was the Horn of Africa.

The term is used frequently by archaeologists as an area that includes Cyprus, where important developments occurred during the Neolithic revolution.

The first sedentary villages were established around fresh water springs and lakes in the Levantine corridor by the Natufian culture.

References

Ancient Near East
Physiographic divisions
Paleobotany
Paleozoology
Recent African origin of modern humans
Animal migration
Great Rift Valley